Marie Cardinal (born Simone Odette Marie-Thérèse Cardinal; 9 March 1929 – 9 May 2001) was a French novelist and occasional actress.

Life and career
Cardinal was born in French Algeria and was the sister of the film director Pierre Cardinal. She received a degree in philosophy from the Sorbonne and in 1953 married the French playwright, actor and director Jean-Pierre Ronfard. They had three children; Alice, Benoit, and Benedict. From 1953 to 1960 she taught philosophy at schools in Salonica, Lisbon, Vienna and Montreal.

Cardinal published her first novel, Écoutez la Mer (Listen to the Sea), in 1962. During the 1960s she published three more novels and was involved with films as well. In 1967 she had a role in Jean-Luc Godard's film Deux Ou Trois Choses Que Je Sais D'elle and played the memorable role of Mouchette's mother in Robert Bresson's film Mouchette.

In 1972 Cardinal published La Clé Sur La Porte (The Key of the Door), followed by Les Mots Pour Le Dire (The Words to Say It) in 1975; these two novels were best sellers and established her reputation. Les Mots Pour Le Dire was the first book by Cardinal to be published in the United States.

Bibliography
 Écoutez la mer (Listen to the Sea) (1962)
 La mule de corbillard (1963)
 La souricière (1965)
 Cet été-là (1967)
 La clé sur la porte (The Key of the Door) (1972)
 Les Mots pour le dire (The Words to Say It) (1975)
 Autrement dit (1977)
 Une vie pour deux (1979)
 Au Pays de mes racines (1980)
 Le passé empiété (1983)
 Les grands désordres (1987)
 Les Pieds-Noirs (1988)
 Comme si de rien n'était (1990)
 Peer Gynt d'Henrik Ibsen (theater) (1991) translation
 Les Troyennes d'Euripide (theater) (1993) translation
 Les jeudis de Charles et Lula (1994)
 Amour... Amours... (1998)
 Oedipe à Colone de Sophocle (theater) (2003) translation

References

Further reading

 A review of The Words to Say It.

External links

1929 births
2001 deaths
20th-century French novelists
Algerian women novelists
Algerian novelists
Algerian writers in French
French film actresses
French women novelists
20th-century French women writers
20th-century Algerian writers
20th-century Algerian women writers